Clifford Laconia Jordan (September 2, 1931 – March 27, 1993) was an American jazz tenor saxophone player. While in Chicago, he performed with Max Roach, Sonny Stitt, and some rhythm and blues groups. He moved to New York City in 1957, after which he recorded three albums for Blue Note. He recorded with Horace Silver, J.J. Johnson, and Kenny Dorham, among others. He was part of the Charles Mingus Sextet, with Eric Dolphy, during its 1964 European tour.

Jordan toured Africa with Randy Weston, and performed in Paris while living in Belgium. In later years, he led his own groups, performed with Cedar Walton's quartet Eastern Rebellion, and led a big band.

Jordan was married to Shirley Jordan, a designer and former owner of Clothing Manufacturing Corporation in New York. He later married Sandy Jordan (née Williams), a graphic artist and Honorary Founders Board member of the Jazz Foundation of America.

Death
Jordan died of lung cancer at the age of 61 in New York City.

Discography

As leader
 1957: Blowing in from Chicago (Blue Note) co-led with John Gilmore
 1957: Cliff Jordan (Blue Note)
 1957: Jenkins, Jordan and Timmons (New Jazz) with John Jenkins and Bobby Timmons
 1957: Cliff Craft (Blue Note)
 1960: Spellbound (Riverside)
 1961: A Story Tale (Jazzland) with Sonny Red
 1961: Starting Time (Jazzland)
 1962: Bearcat (Jazzland)
 1965: These are My Roots: Clifford Jordan Plays Leadbelly (Atlantic)
 1968: Soul Fountain (Vortex)
 1972: In the World (Strata-East)
 1973: Glass Bead Games (Strata-East)
 1974: Half Note (SteepleChase)
 1975: Night of the Mark VII (Muse)
 1975: On Stage Vol. 1 (SteepleChase)
 1975: On Stage Vol. 2 (SteepleChase)
 1975: On Stage Vol. 3 (SteepleChase)
 1975: Firm Roots (SteepleChase)
 1975: The Highest Mountain (SteepleChase)
 1976: Remembering Me-Me (Muse)
 1977: Inward Fire (Muse)
 1978: The Adventurer (Muse)
 1978: Hello, Hank Jones (Eastworld)
 1981: Hyde Park After Dark (Bee Hive) with Victor Sproles, Von Freeman, Cy Touff
 1984: Repetition (Soul Note)
 1984: Dr. Chicago (Bee Hive)
 1984: Two Tenor Winner (Criss Cross) with Junior Cook
 1985: The Rotterdam Session (Audio Daddio) with Philly Joe Jones and James Long
 1986: Royal Ballads (Criss Cross)
 1987: Live at Ethell's (Mapleshade)
 1989: Blue Head (Candid, 1990) with David "Fathead" Newman
 1989: Masters from Different Worlds (Mapleshade) with Ran Blake and Julian Priester
 1990: Four Play (DIW/Columbia) with Richard Davis, James Williams & Ronnie Burrage
 1989-90: The Mellow Side of Clifford Jordan (Mapleshade)
 1990: Play What You Feel (Mapleshade)
 1991: Down Through the Years (Milestone)

As sideman
With Paul Chambers
Paul Chambers Quintet (Blue Note, 1957)
With Sonny Clark
Sonny Clark Quintets (Blue Note, 1957, the three tracks with Clifford Jordan reissued on My Conception, 2008 CD)
With Richard Davis
Epistrophy & Now's the Time (Muse, 1972)
Dealin' (Muse, 1973)
With Eric Dolphy
Iron Man (1963)
Conversations (1963)
With Art Farmer
Mirage (Soul Note, 1982)
You Make Me Smile (Soul Note, 1984)
Something to Live For: The Music of Billy Strayhorn (Contemporary, 1987)
Blame It on My Youth (Contemporary, 1988)
Ph.D. (Contemporary, 1989)
Live at Sweet Basil (Evidence, 1992)
With Dizzy Gillespie
To Bird with Love (Telarc, 1992)
With Slide Hampton
Roots (Criss Cross, 1985)
With John Hicks and Elise Wood
Luminous (Nilva, 1985)
With Andrew Hill
Shades (Soul Note, 1986)
With J. J. Johnson
J.J. Inc. (Columbia, 1960)
With Charles McPherson
Con Alma! (Prestige, 1965)
With Carmen McRae
Any Old Time (1986)
Carmen Sings Monk (1988)
With Charles Mingus
Charles Mingus Sextet with Eric Dolphy Cornell 1964 (Blue Note, 1964 [2007])
Town Hall Concert (Jazz Workshop, 1964)
Astral Weeks
 Revenge! (1964)
The Great Concert of Charles Mingus (America, 1964 [1971])
Mingus in Europe Volume I (Enja, 1964 [1980])
Mingus in Europe Volume II (Enja, 1964 [1980])
Right Now: Live at the Jazz Workshop (Fantasy, 1964)
With Mingus Dynasty
 Live at the Theatre Boulogne-Billancourt/Paris, Vol. 1 (Soul Note, 1988)
 Live at the Theatre Boulogne-Billancourt/Paris, Vol. 2 (Soul Note, 1988)
With Lee Morgan
Here's Lee Morgan (Vee-Jay, 1960)
Expoobident (Vee-Jay, 1960)
Take Twelve (Jazzland, 1962)
With Pony Poindexter
 Pony's Express (Epic, 1962)
With Freddie Redd
Lonely City (Uptown, 1985 [1989])
With Dizzy Reece
Manhattan Project (Bee Hive, 1978) – with Roy Haynes, Art Davis, Charles Davis, Albert Dailey)
With Max Roach
Percussion Bitter Sweet (Impulse!, 1961)
It's Time (Impulse!, 1962)
Speak, Brother, Speak! (Fantasy, 1962)
With Sahib Shihab
The Jazz We Heard Last Summer (Savoy, 1957)
With Horace Silver
Further Explorations (Blue Note, 1958)
With Charles Tolliver
Music Inc. (Strata-East, 1971)
With Mal Waldron
What It Is (Enja, 1981)
With Cedar Walton
Spectrum (Prestige, 1968)
The Electric Boogaloo Song (Prestige, 1969)
A Night at Boomers, Vol. 1 (Muse, 1973)
A Night at Boomers, Vol. 2 (Muse, 1973)
The Pentagon (East Wind, 1976)
With Joe Zawinul
Money in the Pocket (Atlantic, 1967)

References

External links
Clifford Jordan Leader discography, accessed November 7, 2012
Clifford Jordan obituary in The New York Times, accessed January 24, 2019

1931 births
1993 deaths
Post-bop saxophonists
Hard bop saxophonists
Big band saxophonists
American jazz saxophonists
American male saxophonists
Musicians from Chicago
Strata-East Records artists
SteepleChase Records artists
Muse Records artists
Criss Cross Jazz artists
DIW Records artists
Riverside Records artists
Blue Note Records artists
20th-century American saxophonists
Jazz musicians from Illinois
20th-century American male musicians
American male jazz musicians
Dameronia members
Mingus Dynasty (band) members
Mapleshade Records artists